is a Japanese rugby union player who plays as a Fly-half.

References

1994 births
Living people
Japanese rugby union players
Japan international rugby union players
Rugby union fly-halves
Saitama Wild Knights players
Sunwolves players